The Cay is an American television film based on the 1969 book of the same name. It was released on October 21, 1974.

Plot
Phillip is aboard the S.S. Hato, which is torpedoed during World War II. It soon sinks and Phillip awakens on a raft with Timothy, an older black man, and Stew Cat, a stray cat of a crew member on the S.S. Hato. Phillip, who hit his head on the S.S. Hato, soon becomes blind from the head injury. After days on the sea, they notice a Cay in the distance. They all survive on the island, but soon Timothy worries about Phillip if he dies. Timothy prepares him to be self reliant to fish and find food. As the novel goes on, a hurricane hits the Cay. Timothy shields Phillip from the strong winds and rain, flaying his whole body. Phillip regains consciousness and finds Timothy very weak. Timothy manages to get out his last words, "'Phill-eep... you.. all right... be true?' 'Terrible tempis'." Timothy dies. Phillip remains confident until a plane finds over the island, but doesn't stop for him. Phillip, who is still blind, becomes discouraged. When Phillip hears another plane, he realizes the smoke is clear. He decides to put sea brush in the fire to make the smoke thicker and blacker. It becomes visible to the plane, and they call for help. A boat arrives to rescue Phillip and Stew Cat, and they get on a plane home. Phillip is reunited on the plane with his mother and father. He receives surgery on his eyes and his vision is restored. He reminisces about visiting the cay one day. Although not recognizing it by sight but by sound.

Production
Universal TV, NBC and Russell Thacher-Walter Seltzer Productions produced and distributed this film.

The Cay was filmed on location in Belize.

Cast
James Earl Jones as Timothy
Alfred Lutter as Phillip
Gretchen Corbett as Grace – Phillip's Mother

In the film (unlike the book), Phillip's father did not appear.

Awards and nominations

See also
 List of American films of 1974
The Cay, 1969 book
Timothy of the Cay

References

External links

1974 films
American survival films
Films set on uninhabited islands
Films about castaways
Films about survivors of seafaring accidents or incidents
Films shot in Belize
Films set in the Caribbean
Films based on American novels
Films about blind people
NBC network original films
1970s English-language films
1970s American films